The Mount Holyoke College Botanic Garden, in South Hadley, Massachusetts, United States, encompasses the Mount Holyoke College campus, an arboretum, numerous gardens, and the Talcott Greenhouse. It was first designated a botanical garden in 1878, with guidance from Lydia Shattuck, professor of botany. The construction of the Talcott Greenhouse complex, which houses the Botanic Garden's collection of non-hardy plants, began in 1896, after the original greenhouse was destroyed by fire, and was completed in 1899.  

The Botanic Garden serves as an outdoor teaching laboratory as well as a place to arrange and display plants on campus. The Talcott Greenhouse maintains a permanent collection in addition to space for research and teaching purposes.

Principal gardens 
 Class of 1904 Garden - herbaceous perennials
 Drue Matthews Garden - alpine and rock garden plants
 Virginia "Timmy" Craig '31 Rhododendron Garden - rhododendrons and other woodland plants native to Eastern North America and Eastern Asia
 Bullard Garden (Chapel Garden) - trees, shrubs and herbaceous perennials
 Ciruti Center Courtyard - Shade-loving plants such as Ilex (hollies), Hosta, Helleborus and Hydrangea
 Willits-Hallowell Center Courtyard
 Heckel Staircase Garden - perennials and dwarf evergreens

Traditions 
The Greenhouse sustains a college tradition by providing students with plants during their first year, which many try to keep alive until they graduate.

Since 1971, Mount Holyoke has hosted an annual Flower Show each spring.

See also 
 List of botanical gardens in the United States

References

External links
 Mount Holyoke Botanic Garden

Botanical gardens in Massachusetts
Mount Holyoke College
Protected areas of Hampshire County, Massachusetts
Greenhouses in Massachusetts
South Hadley, Massachusetts
1878 establishments in Massachusetts
Protected areas established in 1879